Cladiopsocidae is a family of Psocodea (formerly Psocoptera) belonging to the suborder Psocomorpha. Like the other members of the infraorder Epipsocetae, they have a labrum with two sclerotized ridges.

References

Sources
Lienhard, C. & Smithers, C. N. 2002. Psocoptera (Insecta): World Catalogue and Bibliography. Instrumenta Biodiversitatis, vol. 5. Muséum d'histoire naturelle, Genève.

Psocoptera families
Psocomorpha